Helle Kalda (born 17 February 1950 in Tartu) is an Estonian politician. She has been member of X and XI Riigikogu.

She is a member of Estonian Centre Party.

References

1950 births
Living people
Estonian Centre Party politicians
Members of the Riigikogu, 2003–2007
Members of the Riigikogu, 2007–2011
Women members of the Riigikogu
University of Tartu alumni
Politicians from Tartu
21st-century Estonian women politicians